Aristida dichotoma, known as churchmouse threeawn, fork-tip three-awn, pigbutt three-awn, and poverty grass, is a species of grass from eastern North America. It is native to the Eastern and Midwestern United States and Ontario, Canada. It has been introduced in California. It was described in 1803 by André Michaux.

Aristida dichotoma has also been known as beard grass and branching aristida. The specific epithet is from the Latin for "forked".

References

dichotoma
Plants described in 1803
Flora of North America